Steamin' Demon is a steel roller coaster located at Six Flags Great Escape and Hurricane Harbor in Queensbury, New York.

Ride experience
The ride is located at the front of the park in the Ghosttown area, although the theme of the coaster doesn't match the rest of the park section. The single blue train rides on orange and yellow rails with blue (formerly green) structural supports. The coaster features a single loop and a double corkscrew. The actual ride time is very short, as the roller coaster completes the 1,565 foot run in approximately 37 seconds. The ride only has the ability to run one 28 seat train due to lack of block brakes/sections.

The Steamin' Demon is an early Arrow Dynamics Corkscrew coaster, featuring a layout that was extremely common when originally designed. Many others similar to the Steamin' Demon have been dismantled over the years. The ride itself is rather rough, but it still attracts a regular stream of riders.

History
Steamin' Demon was the first major ride, and the first roller coaster, built after Storytown USA changed its name to the Great Escape. Previously, the coaster was located at Pontchartrain Beach and was named the Ragin’ Cajun.

Six Flags announced on March 3, 2016, that Steamin' Demon would be among several rides at various parks that would receive a virtual reality (VR) upgrade. Riders will have the option to wear Samsung Gear VR headsets, powered by Oculus, to create a 360-degree, 3D experience while riding. The illusion is themed to a fighter jet, where riders fly through a futuristic city as co-pilots battling alien invaders. The feature debuted on the coaster when it reopened in summer of 2016.

References

Roller coasters manufactured by Arrow Dynamics
Queensbury, New York
Roller coasters introduced in 1984
Roller coasters operated by Six Flags
The Great Escape and Hurricane Harbor
Steel roller coasters
Roller coasters in New York (state)